Chowdhary Mohmmad Hussain was an Indian politician and bureaucrat. He was part of 4th, 6th, 8th and 9th Jammu and Kashmir state Legislative assembly (Vidhan Sabha). He represented the Darhal Vidhan Sabha constituency of Rajouri district of erstwhile State of Jammu and Kashmir for 5 times. He was first elected as MLA from this seat, on the mandate of Indian national congress in 1967 and 1969 (bi elections). He remained district chief of the INC for a long period. In 1972 he was denied the mandate by the INC, In 1975 he joined Jammu and Kashmir national conference headed by Sheikh Mohmmed Abdullah. In 1977 he contested the elections from the same vidhan sabha seat on the mandate of Jammu and Kashmir National Conference and was elected for 3rd time to the Vidhan Sabha. He was inducted in the council of ministers of Sheikh Mohmmed Abdullah Ministry. In 1983 he lost the elections to INC candidate and veteran spiritual gujjar leader with a very thin margin. In 1987, general elections to Jammu and Kashmir vidhan sabha, he was again elected (4th time) to represent this constituency. Again, in 1996 elected to vidhan sabha for (5th time), and was again inducted in the council of ministers headed by Dr Farooq Abdullah which he held till his death 30 September 2002. He also served as Block Development Officer from 1957 to 1967. As a minister he headed the revenue, relief and rehabilitation, rural development and Panchayati Raj cooperatives departments etc. His younger son Chowdhary Zulfkar Ali also represents Darhal (Vidhan Sabha) in 11th and 12th Assemblies and was a cabinet minister in the Mufti Mohommad Sayeed and Mehbooba Mufti Governments.

References 

1929 births
2002 deaths
People from Rajouri district
Members of the Jammu and Kashmir Legislative Assembly
Indian National Congress politicians from Jammu and Kashmir
Jammu & Kashmir National Conference politicians